Howard Leslie Shore  (born October 18, 1946) is a Canadian composer and conductor noted for his film scores. He has composed the scores for over 80 films, most notably the scores for The Lord of the Rings and The Hobbit film trilogies. He won three Academy Awards for his work on The Lord of the Rings, with one being for the song "Into the West", an award he shared with Eurythmics lead vocalist Annie Lennox and writer/producer Fran Walsh, who wrote the lyrics. He is also a consistent collaborator with director David Cronenberg, having scored all but one of his films since 1979.

Shore has also composed a few concert works including one opera, The Fly, based on the plot of Cronenberg's 1986 film, which premiered at the Théâtre du Châtelet in Paris on July 2, 2008; a short piece named Fanfare for the Wanamaker Organ and the Philadelphia Orchestra; and a short overture for the Swiss 21st Century Symphony Orchestra. Shore has also composed for television, including serving as the original musical director for the American sketch comedy show Saturday Night Live from 1975 to 1980.

In addition to his three Academy Awards, Shore has also won three Golden Globe Awards and four Grammy Awards.

Early life and career
Howard Shore was born in Toronto, Ontario, Canada, the son of Bernice (née Ash) and Mac Shore. Shore is Jewish. He started studying music at the age of 8 or 9. He learned a multitude of instruments and began playing in bands at the ages of 13 and 14. When Shore was 13, he met and became good friends with a young Lorne Michaels in summer camp, and this friendship would later be influential in his career. By 17, he decided he wanted to pursue music in his adult life too. He studied music at Berklee College of Music in Boston after graduating from Forest Hill Collegiate Institute.

From 1969 to 1972, Shore was a member of the jazz fusion band Lighthouse. In 1970, he became the music director for Lorne Michaels and Hart Pomerantz's short-lived TV program The Hart & Lorne Terrific Hour. Shore wrote the music for Canadian magician Doug Henning's magic musical Spellbound in 1974 and, from 1975 to 1980, he was the musical director for Lorne Michaels' influential late-night NBC comedy show Saturday Night Live, appearing in many musical sketches, including Howard Shore and His All-Nurse Band, and dressed as a beekeeper for a John Belushi/Dan Aykroyd performance of the Slim Harpo classic "I'm a King Bee". Shore also suggested the name for The Blues Brothers to Dan Aykroyd and John Belushi.

Film scoring

1978–2000
Shore's first film score was to the low budget thriller I Miss You, Hugs and Kisses (1978), followed by David Cronenberg's first major film, The Brood (1979). He would go on to score all of Cronenberg's subsequent films, with the exception of The Dead Zone (1983), which was scored by Michael Kamen. The first film he scored that was not directed by Cronenberg was Martin Scorsese's After Hours (1985). Following that, he scored The Fly (1986), again directed by Cronenberg. Two years later, he composed the score to Big (1988), directed by Penny Marshall and starring Tom Hanks. He then scored two more of David Cronenberg's films: Dead Ringers (1988) and Naked Lunch (1991).

During 1991, Shore composed the score for the highly acclaimed film The Silence of the Lambs, starring Jodie Foster and Anthony Hopkins, and directed by Jonathan Demme. He received his first BAFTA nomination for the score. The film became the third (and most recent) to win the five major Academy Awards (Best Picture, Best Director, Best Screenplay, Best Actor, and Best Actress). Shore is the only living composer to have scored a "Top Five" Oscar-winning film.

During 1993, he composed the scores for M. Butterfly (another collaboration with Cronenberg), Philadelphia (his second collaboration with Jonathan Demme), and Mrs. Doubtfire, directed by Chris Columbus. The latter two films were highly successful, Philadelphia winning Tom Hanks his first Oscar.

Shore scored another three films in 1994: The Client, Ed Wood, and Nobody's Fool. Ed Wood is notable for being one of the three films directed by Tim Burton that did not feature a score by Danny Elfman.

Shore continued to score numerous films from 1995 to 2001, including two David Fincher films, Seven (1995) and The Game (1997), and The Truth About Cats and Dogs (1996), directed by Michael Lehmann; he also collaborated on two films with Cronenberg, along with Tom Hanks' directorial debut, That Thing You Do!. He scored Kevin Smith’s Dogma (1999).  Shore also composed the score of the 2000 film The Cell.

2001–2006

Major success came in 2001 with his score to The Lord of the Rings: The Fellowship of the Ring, the first film in the highly acclaimed The Lord of the Rings trilogy. The news that Shore would score the trilogy surprised some, since he was primarily associated with dark, ominous films and had never scored an epic of this scale. However, the score was hugely successful and won Shore his first Oscar, as well as a Grammy Award, and garnered Shore nominations for a Golden Globe and a BAFTA. The music editor on the trilogy was Suzana Peric.  

The following year, Shore composed the scores to Panic Room, Gangs of New York (replacing Elmer Bernstein), and The Lord of the Rings: The Two Towers, the second film in the trilogy. (The latter two films were both nominated for the Academy Award for Best Picture.) Initially, Shore's score for The Two Towers was going to be deemed ineligible for submission to the Academy, due to a new rule that disallowed the submission of scores which contained themes from previous work. However, the implementation of this rule change was subsequently postponed, meaning the score remained eligible. Ultimately, The Two Towers score did not receive an Academy Award nomination; Shore did, however, receive a BAFTA nomination for Gangs of New York.

In 2003, he composed the score for the final film in The Lord of the Rings trilogy, The Lord of the Rings: The Return of the King. The film was the most successful film in the trilogy and the most successful of the year. Shore won his second Oscar for Best Original Score, as well as a third for Best Original Song for "Into the West", which he shared with Fran Walsh and Annie Lennox. Shore also won his first Golden Globe, his third and fourth Grammy (the fourth for Best Song), and was nominated for a third BAFTA. The scores of The Lord of the Rings, performed primarily by the London Philharmonic Orchestra, became one of the most successful film scores ever written and the biggest success in Shore's career. The score has been repeatedly voted to be the best film score, and the review site Filmtracks named Shore's score "arguably the most respected and impressive trilogy of music of all time: Howard Shore's massive work for Peter Jackson's The Lord of the Rings."

In 2004, Shore again collaborated with Martin Scorsese, scoring his epic film The Aviator, this time with the Brussels Philharmonic. He won a second Golden Globe for the score, becoming the third composer to have won consecutive Golden Globes in the Original Score category. He also received his sixth Grammy nomination, and his fifth BAFTA nomination.

He collaborated again with David Cronenberg in 2005 to score A History of Violence, starring Viggo Mortensen. The film was a success and received two Oscar nominations. In 2006, he collaborated for the fourth time with Martin Scorsese, this time to score The Departed. The film was highly successful and won four Oscars, including a long-awaited win for Scorsese, and Best Picture.

Although Shore was originally commissioned to compose the soundtrack for King Kong, he was later replaced by James Newton Howard due to "differing creative aspirations for the score" on his and the filmmakers' parts. This was a mutual agreement between himself and Peter Jackson. Despite this, Shore has a cameo near the end of the film as the conductor of the orchestra in the theater, performing portions of Max Steiner's score to the original 1933 version of the film.

2007–present
In 2007, Shore composed the music for Soul of the Ultimate Nation, an online multiplayer video game. The soundtrack is notable for being the first video game soundtrack to feature Lydia Kavina on the theremin. During 2007 he also composed the scores for The Last Mimzy and Eastern Promises, the latter of which includes a section that has been performed in concert as Shore's Concertino for violin solo and chamber orchestra. Eastern Promises was another collaboration with David Cronenberg and earned Shore his fourth Golden Globe nomination. In 2008, he scored Doubt, starring Meryl Streep and directed by John Patrick Shanley. The film was a success, earning five Oscar nominations.

In 2010, Shore composed the score to Eclipse, the third installment in the Twilight film series, following Carter Burwell and Alexandre Desplat, who scored the first and second films, respectively. He also replaced John Corigliano to score Edge of Darkness, starring Mel Gibson.

Shore's 2011 projects were A Dangerous Method, continuing his long-term collaboration with director David Cronenberg. He also composed the score to Martin Scorsese's Hugo, his fifth collaboration with the director, which earned him a sixth Golden Globe nomination and fourth Oscar nomination.

He also composed the score to Peter Jackson's The Hobbit film series. In addition, Shore composed the opening theme for the Rings of Power show run by Amazon.

Conducting and performing

Since 2004, he has toured the world conducting local orchestras in the performance of his new symphonic arrangement of his highly acclaimed Lord of the Rings scores. The new work is entitled The Lord of the Rings: Symphony in Six Movements. There are two movements for each of the movies, and an intermission between the second and third (or first and second film titles) movements. The concert presentation of the symphony also includes projected still images of sketches by John Howe and Alan Lee relating the music being performed to scenes from the films. Recently, however, Shore has been busy with other projects, leaving other conductors including Markus Huber, Ludwig Wicki, Alexander Mickelthwaite, and John Mauceri to lead the orchestras.

April 24, 2008 marked the North American Live to Projection debut of Fellowship of the Ring, with the score performed live by the Winnipeg Symphony Orchestra, conducted by Ludwig Wicki. Wicki also conducted the Filene Center Orchestra at the Wolf Trap Farm Park in Vienna, Virginia on May 21 and 22, 2008 in the U.S. premiere of the Fellowship of the Ring Live to Projection.

September 16, 2010 Shore conducted the RSO Vienna (Vienna Radio Symphony Orchestra) which performed "In Dreams from The Fellowship of the Ring" at Hollywood in Vienna in Vienna, Austria.
Shore was commissioned by Macy's to write a Fanfare for the Store's 150th anniversary featuring the Philadelphia Orchestra and the Wanamaker Organ, the world's largest playing pipe organ. The work was debuted in the Grand Court of Macy's Philadelphia Store on September 27, 2008 in a concert that drew reviews from most of the major East Coast newspapers.

Shore's opera The Fly had its world premiere performance at the Théâtre du Châtelet in Paris on July 2, 2008 and its United States premiere at Los Angeles Opera on September 7, 2008. The production was directed by David Cronenberg and conducted by Plácido Domingo. The Fly had a new production mounted by Theatre Trier in Germany in 2014 staged by Sebastian Welker and conducted by Joongbae Jee.

Shore was commissioned by the Beijing Music Festival to write Ruin and Memory, a piano concerto, for the pianist Lang Lang. The world premiere was on October 11, 2010 performed by Lang Lang, The China Philharmonic Orchestra and conducted by Long Yu. His second concerto, Mythic Gardens, premiered April 27, 2012 with Sophie Shao on cello solo, The American Symphony Orchestra and conducted by Leon Botstein.

Shore's song cycle A Palace Upon the Ruins premiered in 2014 at the Bridgehampton Chamber Music Festival and at the La Jolla SummerFest featuring mezzo-soprano Jennifer Johnson Cano. A Palace Upon the Ruins is a song cycle of six songs with words by Elizabeth Cotnoir.

Sea to Sea was commissioned by New Brunswick Youth Orchestra in celebration of Canada's 150th anniversary of confederation and premiered on July 2, 2017 in Moncton, New Brunswick with soloist Measha Brueggergosman and Antonio Delgado conducting. Sea to Sea has lyrics by Elizabeth Cotnoir.

The song cycle L'Aube premiered October 19 & 20, 2017 in Toronto at Roy Thompson Hall conducted by Peter Oundjian and performed by soloist Susan Platts and commissioning orchestra, the Toronto Symphony Orchestra. L'Aube consists of five songs with text by Elizabeth Cotnoir.

The Forest a guitar concerto composed for Miloš Karadaglić will premiere in Ottawa on May 1 & 2, 2019 with the National Arts Centre Orchestra and Alexander Shelley conducting.

Television
In addition to writing the original theme song for Saturday Night Live, as well as the closing theme, Shore also co-wrote the theme song for Late Night with Conan O'Brien with John Lurie. The theme was carried over to The Tonight Show when O'Brien succeeded Jay Leno as host.

In September 2021, it was reported that Shore was in talk to compose the music for the upcoming The Lord of the Rings TV series on Amazon Prime Video, returning from the Lord of the Rings and Hobbit films.

Radio
Shore narrated a one-hour CBC Radio documentary/soundscape on music in thriller/suspense film genres also including references to radio dramas and other media. The episode was called "Unsettling Scores" and premiered on the program called Inside the Music.

Personal life
Shore is married to Elizabeth Cotnoir, a writer, producer and documentary filmmaker. He has a daughter, Mae. He is the uncle of film composer Ryan Shore.

As of 2004, Shore lives in Tuxedo Park, New York.

Filmography

Film

1970s

1980s

1990s

2000s

2010s

2020s

Television films and series 
 The Hart and Lorne Terrific Hour (1970, musical director)
 Saturday Night Live (1975–86, musical director)
 Steve Martin's Best Show Ever (1981)
 The New Show (1984)
 Big Shots in America (1985)
 Scales of Justice (1990–91)
 Late Night with Conan O'Brien (1993–2009, theme music)
 Nova (1997)
 POV (2009)
 The Tonight Show with Conan O'Brien (2009–10, theme music)
 The Lord of the Rings: The Rings of Power (2022, theme music)

Video games 

 Soul of the Ultimate Nation (2007)
 Honor of Kings (2015)

Selected concert music works
 Fanfare, organ (2008)
 The Fly, opera (2008)
 Ruin and Memory, piano concerto (2010)
 Mythic Gardens, cello concerto (2012)
A Palace Upon the Ruins, song cycle (2014)
L'Aube (The Dawn), song cycle (2017)

Accolades

Shore has received four Academy Award nominations, winning three, two for Best Original Score, for The Lord of the Rings: The Fellowship of the Ring (2001), and The Lord of the Rings: The Return of the King (2003). He also won the Oscar for Best Original Song for "Into the West" from The Lord of the Rings: The Return of the King. He received his fourth nomination for his work on Hugo.

Shore has also received six Golden Globe nominations, winning three consecutive awards for Best Original Score and Best Original Song - "Into the West" for The Lord of the Rings: The Return of the King (2003) and The Aviator (2004), making him the second composer (after Alan Menken) to have received consecutive Golden Globe Awards for Best Original Score. He also won three consecutive Grammy Awards for Best Score for each of the Lord of the Rings films, and received a second award in 2003 for the song "Into the West" from "Return of the King" in the category of Best Song. He has also received five BAFTA nominations, but has not won.

On June 11, 2007, Shore was awarded an Honorary Doctor of Letters Degree from York University in Toronto for "his sweeping artistic vision".

Shore has also been honored with awards from The National Board of Review, Recording Academy Honors, The Broadcast Film Critics, Chicago Film Critics, Genie Award, World Soundtrack Award, New York's Gotham Award, and The Saturn Award for Science Fiction.

Shore is the first recipient of the Film & TV Music Award for Best Score for a Science Fiction Feature Film for The Last Mimzy.

In May 2008, he was awarded an Honorary Doctorate of Music from Berklee College of Music during Berklee's commencement ceremony at the Agganis Arena.

On September 16, 2010 he was awarded the Max Steiner Film Music Achievement Award by the City of Vienna at the yearly film music gala concert Hollywood in Vienna.

In 2012, he received Canada's Governor General's Performing Arts Awards for Lifetime Artistic Achievement.

In 2016, he was appointed as an Officer of the Order of Canada for his work towards the film and music industry.

See also
 List of film director and composer collaborations

References

External links

 
 
 Howard Shore Interview at Tracksounds 
 
 A Composer's Dream, a short film tribute to Shore on his Governor General's Performing Arts Award, National Film Board of Canada website

1946 births
20th-century Canadian composers
20th-century Canadian male musicians
20th-century classical composers
21st-century Canadian composers
21st-century Canadian male musicians
21st-century classical composers
Berklee College of Music alumni
Best Original Music Score Academy Award winners
Best Original Score Genie and Canadian Screen Award winners
Best Original Song Academy Award-winning songwriters
Best Original Song Genie and Canadian Screen Award winners
Canadian classical composers
Canadian contemporary classical composers
Canadian film score composers
Canadian male classical composers
Canadian opera composers
Georges Delerue Award winners
Governor General's Performing Arts Award winners
Golden Globe Award-winning musicians
Grammy Award winners
Jewish Canadian musicians
Jewish classical composers
Jewish opera composers
Lighthouse (band) members
Living people
Male film score composers
Male opera composers
Musicians from Toronto
Officers of the Order of Canada
Saturday Night Live Band members
Varèse Sarabande Records artists